Jeon Hye-bin (born September 27, 1983), also known as BIN, is a South Korean actress, singer and model. In 2002, she began her career as singer of the short-lived, three-member girl group LUV. However, the group disbanded the following year due to individual goals.

Following the disbandment of LUV, Jeon released her first solo album, Love Somebody. She ventured into acting and appeared in her first television drama, Sang Doo! Let's Go to School, and was cast in the 2004 horror film Dead Friend. On 23 September 2005, she found mainstream success with her second album, In My Fantasy. She decided in 2008 to focus on her acting career and starred in the television series Yaksha (2010), My Love By My Side (2011), Insu, The Queen Mother (2011) and Queen of the Office (2013), Gunman in Joseon (2014) and Another Oh Hae-young (2016).

Early life
Jeon was born in Namyangju, Gyeonggi-do, South Korea, on September 27, 1983. She attended Kyewon Arts High School and later furthered her studies at Dong guk University under the faculty of film and theater studies.

Career

2002: LUV

Jeon Hye-bin made her entertainment debut in 2002  with the band LUV, alongside Jo Eun-byul and Oh Yeon-seo. They released their first album Story that year, which included the singles "Orange Girl" and "I Still Believe in You". However, the band was short-lived and disbanded barely after six months due to their low popularity.

2003–2006: Acting debut and solo career
In 2003, Jeon appeared in the third season of MBC's sitcom Nonstop and was later cast in KBS' television series Sang Doo! Let's Go to School. Her first solo album Love Somebody was released on July 31.

In 2004, Jeon made her big screen debut in the horror film Dead Friend. She was then cast in Wet Dreams 2, a sex comedy film.

On May 22, 2005, she appeared on the 41st episode of Banjun Drama, a mini-drama series of SBS Good Sunday program, and subsequently appeared in 12 additional episodes. She also had a supporting role in SBS' romantic comedy series Only You.

Her second album In My Fantasy released on September 23, 2005. The title song, "2AM", which was produced by Mr. Tyfoon, was heavily criticized for its suggestive dance routine.

2007–present: Acting career
In 2007, Jeon played supporting roles in romantic comedy series Witch Yoo Hee and historical drama The King and I. In 2008, she starred in the legal thriller drama The Scale of Providence.

In 2009, Jeon played a gumiho in a segment of Hometown of Legends, a ten-episode horror drama which consists of several stories of Korean traditional myths and folk tales.

In 2010, she played the leading role in OCN's action historical drama Yaksha.

In 2011, Jeon starred in SBS' family drama My Love By My Side. She next starred in JTBC's historical drama Insu, The Queen Mother, playing Queen Jeheon.

Jeon, who is well known for her love of fitness and exercise, released a beauty book titled Heaven's Stylish Body in 2011, which included her fitness and fashion tips. She followed up with the launch of an iPad diet app in 2012. On January 23, 2012, Jeon appeared in the 2012 Korean New Year Special of SBS' survival show Law of the Jungle W. She joined the show again in September, this time for the Madagascar episodes.

After a year-long hiatus from television, Jeon was cast in the KBS2 office drama Queen of the Office. In October 2013, Jeon joined the cast of Beating Hearts, a reality show with a group of celebrities training to become firefighters. On the 100th episode of Law of the Jungle: Borneo, she appeared as a guest.

In 2014, she was cast in KBS' period action drama Gunman in Joseon.

In 2015, Jeon was cast in the sports film The Legend of a Mermaid, playing a former national synchronized swimmer.

Jeon received renewed recognition as an actress with her role as "Gold Hae-young" in the romantic comedy series Another Oh Hae-young (2016).
She next starred in the romance film With or Without You, playing a divorcee. The same year, Jeon featured in MBC's legal drama Woman with a Suitcase.

In 2017, Jeon starred in SBS' legal thriller Falsify.

In 2018, Jeon starred in the web drama Number Woman Gye Sook-ja.  She was cast in the family drama film Cheer Up Mystery.

In 2019, Jeon starred in the family drama What's Wrong, Poong-sang and an American-remake series Leverage.

In June 2019, Jeon signed with new agency Pan Stars Company.

Other ventures
Jeon was the CEO of ByHeaven, an online shopping mall which ceased operations in 2014.

Philanthropy
In 2005, Jeon was the ambassador of the Make-A-Wish Foundation in South Korea. On 29 October 2012, she donated the proceeds from her personally designed hair dryer to Make-A-Wish (Korea).

Personal life
An accident in early 2006 forced Jeon to undergo nose and teeth reconstruction. She eventually confirmed that she underwent plastic surgery when rumors were quickly spreading about the change in her appearance.

Jeon married a non-celebrity on December 7, 2019 in Bali. On April 7, 2022, Jeon's agency announced that she is pregnant with her first child. On September 30, 2022, she gave birth to a son.

Discography

Studio albums

Single albums

Filmography

Television series

Web series

Film

Variety show

Music video

Theater

Bibliography
 Heaven's Stylish Body (Published on 27 June 2011)

Awards and nominations

See also

 List of South Korean actresses
 List of South Korean musicians

References

External links

 
 
 
 
 

1983 births
IHQ (company) artists
Living people
People from Namyangju
K-pop singers
South Korean women pop singers
South Korean female idols
South Korean dance musicians
South Korean television actresses
South Korean film actresses
Dongguk University alumni
21st-century South Korean actresses
21st-century South Korean singers
21st-century South Korean women singers